This is a list of current and former electricity-generating power stations in the British Crown Dependencies. The Crown Dependencies are the Bailiwick of Jersey, the Bailiwick of Guernsey and the Isle of Man. They are British Islands but are not part of the United Kingdom.

In addition to the generation of electricity at operational stations, there are several sub-sea cables that connect to these power stations to the United Kingdom and France. They include the Isle of Man to England Interconnector and the Channel Islands Electricity Grid.

See also 

 Jersey Electricity Company
 Guernsey Electricity
Channel Islands Electricity Grid
 Manx Utilities
 List of power stations in England
 List of power stations in Scotland
 List of power stations in Wales
 List of power stations in Northern Ireland
List of power stations in France

References 

British Crown Dependencies
Electric power infrastructure in the United Kingdom